In graph theory, an area of mathematics, common graphs belong to a branch of extremal graph theory concerning inequalities in homomorphism densities.

Common graphs are closely related to other graph notions dealing with homomorphism density inequalities. For example, common graphs are a more general case of Sidorenko graphs.

Definition 
A graph  is common if the inequality:

The inequality is tight because the lower bound is always reached when  is the constant graphon .

Interpretations of definition 
Hence, we see that  holds. This, in turn, means that common graph  commonly appears as subgraph.

So, common graph  is a graph where it attains its minimum number of appearance as a monochromatic subgraph of graph  at the graph  with 

. The above definition using the generalized homomorphism density can be understood in this way.

Examples 

 As stated above, all Sidorenko graphs are common graphs. Hence, any known Sidorenko graph is an example of a common graph, and, most notably, cycles of even length are common. However, these are limited examples since all Sidorenko graphs are bipartite graphs while there exist non-bipartite common graphs, as demonstrated below.
 The triangle graph  is one simple example of non-bipartite common graph.
 , the graph obtained by removing an edge of the complete graph on 4 vertices , is common.
 Non-example: It was believed for a time that all graphs are common. In particular,  is not common even though  is common.

Proofs

Sidorenko graphs are common
A graph  is a Sidorenko graph if it satisfies  for all graphons .

In that case, . Furthermore, which follows from the definition of homomorphism density. Combining this with Jensen's inequality for the function :

Thus, the conditions for common graph is met.

The triangle graph is common

Each term in the expression can be written in terms of homomorphism densities of smaller graphs. By the definition of homomorphism densities:

 
 
 

where  denotes the complete bipartite graph on  vertex on one part and  vertices on the other. It follows:

 .

 can be related to  thanks to the symmetry between the variables  and :

where the last step follows from the integral Cauchy–Schwarz inequality. Finally:

. 

This proof can be obtained from taking the continuous analog of Theorem 1 in "On Sets Of Acquaintances And Strangers At Any Party"

See also 

 Sidorenko's conjecture

References 

Graph families
Extremal graph theory